Saturn Outhouse is an EP by the San Diego, California post-hardcore band Pitchfork, released in 1989 by Nemesis Records.

It is the band's only EP and is currently out of print. All 3 tracks were included on the 2003 CD re-release of the band's album Eucalyptus, on Swami Records.

Track listing
"Thin Ice"
"Goat"
"Sinking"

Performers
Rick Froberg (aka Rick Fork) – vocals
John Reis – guitar
Don Ankrom – bass
Joey Piro – drums

Album information
Record label: Nemesis Records
Recorded 1988 at Radio Tokyo

References

1989 EPs
Pitchfork (band) albums